Matjaž Kladnik (born 19 September 1975) is a Slovenian ski jumper. He competed in the normal hill and large hill events at the 1994 Winter Olympics.

References

1975 births
Living people
Slovenian male ski jumpers
Olympic ski jumpers of Slovenia
Ski jumpers at the 1994 Winter Olympics
Skiers from Ljubljana